Jitan station is a railway station on the Gyeongbu Line in Korea.

Railway stations in North Chungcheong Province